The Waiting Game may refer to:

Films and television
 The Waiting Game (film), a 1999 American independent film starring Will Arnett
 The Waiting Game, a 2001 TV movie starring Chris Potter
 The Waiting Game (game show), a 2001–2002 game show hosted by Ruby Wax

Music
 The Waiting Game (Una Healy album), 2017
 The Waiting Game (Tina Brooks album), 1961
 Waiting Game (album), an album by Zoot Sims and Orchestra
 "The Waiting Game", a 1985 song by The Expression
 "The Waiting Game" (song), 1987 song by Squeeze
 "Waiting Game", 1989 single by British jazz-pop act Swing Out Sister
 "Waiting Game" (The Cooper Temple Clause song), 2007
 "Waiting Game" (Banks song), 2013
 "Waiting Game", 2016 song by Parson James from his The Temple EP